The Egypt women's national under-23 volleyball team, represents Egypt in international volleyball competitions and friendly matches.

Results
 Champions   Runners up   Third place   Fourth place

Green border color indicates tournament was held on home soil.

FIVB U23 World Championship

African U23 Championship

Team

Current squad

The following is the Egyptian roster in the 2017 FIVB Women's U23 World Championship.

Head coach: Maged Mohamed

References

External links
www.evbf.org 

Volleyball
National women's under-23 volleyball teams
Volleyball in Egypt
Women's sport in Egypt